Cheshmeh-ye Seyfollahi (also Romanized as Cheshmeh-ye Seyfollahī) is a village in Balvard Rural District, in the Central District of Sirjan County, Kerman Province, Iran. At the 2006 census, its population was 39, in 8 families.

References 

Populated places in Sirjan County